Mount Airy  is a city in Surry County, North Carolina, United States.  As of the 2020 census, the city population was 10,611.

History
Mount Airy was settled in the 1750s as a stagecoach stop on the road between Winston-Salem, North Carolina and Galax, Virginia. It was named for a nearby plantation. Mount Airy was incorporated in 1885. The city's official seal was established in 1977, which depicts major industries that are home to Mount Airy including: furniture, textiles, and the granite quarry. In 1994, Mount Airy was named an All American City.

The W. F. Carter House, William Carter House, Edgar Harvey Hennis House, William Alfred Moore House, Mount Airy Historic District, North Carolina Granite Corporation Quarry Complex, Renfro Mill, and Trinity Episcopal Church are listed on the National Register of Historic Places.

Geography
Mount Airy is located at  (36.5006, −80.6093), along the Ararat River, about 5 km (3 mi) south of the Virginia state line. The city is located at the foothills of the Blue Ridge Mountains, approximately 14 miles from the Blue Ridge Parkway. It has a humid subtropical climate (Cfa) and the hardiness zone is 7a.

Demographics

2020 census

As of the 2020 United States census, there were 10,676 people, 4,571 households, and 2,530 families residing in the city.

2010 census
As of the census of 2010, there were 10,388 people in 4,934 households. The people per square mile was 891.4. There were 5,296 housing units. The Population percent change from 2000 to 2010 was 22.4% up. The racial makeup of the city was 84.1% White descent, 8.2% African American, 0.3% American Indian and Alaska Native, 1.4% Asian, 0.1% Native Hawaiian and Other Pacific Islander, 2.2% Persons reporting two or more races, 6.7% Hispanic or Latino. Persons per household was 2.10. Average household income was $35,428. Persons below poverty level was 21.1%. High school graduates were 76.9% and bachelor's degree or higher was 25.9%.

As of the census of 2000, there were 8,484 people, 3,667 households, and 2,130 families residing in the city. The population density was 1,010.8 people per square mile (390.4/km2). There were 4,129 housing units at an average density of 491.9 per square mile (190.0/km2). The racial makeup of the city was 85.34% White descent, 7.99% African American, 0.35% Native American, 2.55% Asian American, 0.05% Pacific Islander, 2.49% from other races, and 1.24% from two or more races. Hispanic or Latino of any race were 5.87% of the population.

There were 3,667 households, out of which 24.3% had children under the age of 18 living with them, 40.6% were married couples living together, 14.0% had a female householder with no husband present, and 41.9% were non-families. 38.5% of all households were made up of individuals, and 19.6% had someone living alone who was 65 years of age or older. The average household size was 2.16 and the average family size was 2.87.

In the city, the population was spread out, with 21.6% under the age of 18, 6.5% from 18 to 24, 25.1% from 25 to 44, 21.3% from 45 to 64, and 25.6% who were 65 years of age or older. The median age was 43 years. For every 100 females, there were 84.5 males. For every 100 females age 18 and over, there were 78.4 males.

The median income for a household in the city was $26,910, and the median income for a family was $33,412. Males had a median income of $27,299 versus $24,830 for females. The per capita income for the city was $17,237. About 17.4% of families and 19.9% of the population were below the poverty line, including 24.7% of those under age 18 and 20.7% of those age 65 or over.

Mayberry 
Actor Andy Griffith was born in Mount Airy, and the town is considered to have been the basis for Mayberry, the setting of the TV shows The Andy Griffith Show and Mayberry R.F.D..
The community holds an annual "Mayberry Days" celebration during the last weekend of September; 30,000 attended in 2009, and 90,000 attended for the show's 50th anniversary in 2010. The University of North Carolina at Greensboro estimates the town receives $5 million each year as a result.  Surviving members of the cast, along with family members of other cast members, often visit.  The 2012 event was slated to have Karen Knotts (Don's daughter) and George Lindsey Jr. (eponymous son of the actor who portrayed Goober).

Several Ford Galaxie police cars, painted to resemble those used on the show, give rides to guests. A barber shop has been named "Floyd's."

The Andy Griffith Museum, founded in 2009 by Emmett Forrest, attracts 200 visitors a day. The 2,500-square-feet museum, located half a mile from Griffith's childhood home, houses the world's largest collection of Andy Griffith memorabilia.

Mayberry Days will continue on September 19-25, 2022

The Autumn Leaves Festival 
Held the second weekend in October, the Autumn Leaves Festival attracts over 200,000 people to the city during the festival weekend. Vendors sell food and other items, and there is a stage for musicians.

Bluegrass and old-time music
The home of old-time music legend  Tommy Jarrell,
bluegrass gospel legends The Easter Brothers,  country singer Donna Fargo, Mount Airy has a long history with regional music. Mount Airy's WPAQ is one of the few Bluegrass and Old-Time music stations still operating and has been airing the live radio show Merry-Go-Round from the Downtown Cinema Theatre since 1948. Weekly bluegrass jam sessions at The Andy Griffith Playhouse and the annual Mount Airy Fiddlers Convention also serve to attract old-time musicians from across the region and the world. The Fiddlers Convention first began in 1972, and is held the first weekend in June at Veterans Memorial Park. The Blue Ridge Music Center with its amphitheater and music museum of old-time music is just a few miles away on the Blue Ridge Parkway at Milepost 213, near Galax, Virginia. This area is home to the Round Peak style of old-time music, which started in the Round Peak community, just west of Mount Airy.

Chang and Eng Bunker
Mount Airy was the residence of Chang and Eng Bunker (1811–1874), conjoined twins joined by a band of cartilage at the chest (xiphopagus).
They are buried at White Plains Baptist Church about 2 miles from Mt Airy Main street. Many of their descendants still live in the Mount Airy area.

Education
The Mt. Airy Public Library serves the community. The library won the American Institute of Architects Design Award.

Mount Airy has a city-funded school district consisting of four schools.

Mount Airy City Schools
Mount Airy High School
Mount Airy Middle School
Jones Intermediate School
Tharrington Primary School

Surry County Schools
There are also other schools in Mount Airy that are controlled by the Surry County Schools district.

North Surry High School
Gentry Middle School
Meadowview Magnet Middle School
Cedar Ridge Elementary School
Flat Rock Elementary School
Franklin Elementary School
White Plains Elementary School

Charter schools
Mount Airy has one k-12 public-funded charter school, 
Millennium Charter Academy.

Private schools
White Plains Christian School

Notable people
 Frank Beamer (born 1946), head football coach Virginia Tech, born in Mount Airy, raised in Fancy Gap, Virginia
 Ron Blackburn (1935–1998), Major League Baseball player
 Chang and Eng Bunker (1811–1874), famous "Siamese Twins" conjoined twins of showman P.T. Barnum who settled in Mount Airy after they retired from show business 
 Ben Callahan (1957–2007), Major League Baseball player
 Bill Cox (1929–2017), NFL defensive player
 Chubby Dean (1916–1970), Major League Baseball player
 Donna Fargo (born 1945), country music singer and songwriter, best known for the song "The Happiest Girl in the Whole USA"
 Benton Flippen (1920–2011), old-time fiddler, banjo player, and guitarist
 Emmett Forrest (1927–2013), founder of the Andy Griffith Museum
 Maddie Gardner, (born 1993), local news reporter and internationally recognized cheerleader
 Andy Griffith (1926–2012), American actor
 Bill Hayes, television producer
 Caleb V. Haynes (1895–1966), United States Air Force major general
 Jerry Hemmings (born 1948), basketball coach
 Mildred "Bonnie" Hines (1955–2022), Rev. Dr. Hines Elected 98th Bishop in A.M.E. Zion Church; First/sole Female Bishop born in Surry Cty, NC)
 Tommy Jarrell (1901–1985), old-time fiddler, banjo player, and singer 
 Luke Lambert, NASCAR crew chief
 Betty Lynn (1926–2021), actress
 Mark Daniel Merritt (born 1961), American music composer
 Alex Sink, former chief financial officer of Florida, Democratic nominee for governor of Florida in 2010
 Anna Wood (born 1985), actress

Sister city
Mount Airy has one sister city:
  Samut Songkhram, Thailand

References

Further reading
 Social attitudes in Mount Airy

External links

 City of Mount Airy
 VisitMayberry
 Downtown Mount Airy
 Mayberry Days
 Mayberry Takeout
 Mt Airy NC Chamber 
 Andy Griffith Museum
 Mt. Airy Museum of Regional History

 
Cities in North Carolina
Cities in Surry County, North Carolina
Populated places established in the 1750s